Sarah Lancashire is an English actress whose career began in 1986. Lancashire's first acting roles were in local theatre, with small guest roles in television dramas and sitcoms. After coming to public attention with roles in programmes such as Coronation Street, (1987, 1991–1996, 2000) Where the Heart Is (1997–1999) and Clocking Off (2000), Lancashire signed a two-year golden handcuffs contract with the ITV network, appearing exclusively in ITV1 programming for the next two years. Lancashire has continued to work extensively across a variety of television drama genres, including guest appearances, regular roles in returning series and with featured roles in standalone miniseries' and television films. Her more prolific work includes the drama series' Lark Rise to Candleford (2008–2011), Last Tango in Halifax (2012–2020) and Happy Valley (2014–2016,2023).

Lancashire has appeared in the feature films And When Did You Last See Your Father? and Dad's Army and has returned to West End Theatre several times since her 1990 stint in Blood Brothers. Her combined acting credits have earned Lancashire a number of awards and nominations over a career spanning four decades and a prominent status within the British Television Industry of the 21st century.  Lancashire was appointed Officer of the Order of the British Empire (OBE) in the 2017 Birthday Honours for services to drama.

Television

Acting

Other

Film

Theatre credits

References

External links

Sarah Lancashire credits at the Independent Talent Group website

Actress filmographies
British filmographies